W35DW-D is a low-powered television station licensed to Greenville, North Carolina. The station, which broadcasts its digital signal on virtual channel 45 and UHF channel 35, is owned by DTV America, a subsidiary of HC2 Holdings. The station is affiliated with Grit.

History 
The station’s construction permit was initially issued on February 22, 2011 under the calls of W45DU-D and then WPDU-LD. It changed to the current callsign of W35DW-D on June 14, 2019.

Digital channels

References

External links
DTV America

Low-power television stations in the United States
Innovate Corp.
Television stations in North Carolina
Television channels and stations established in 2021
2021 establishments in North Carolina